Jane Castro (born April 30, 1982) is an American musician, recording artist and TV personality who is active in the American and Latin markets. Born in Miami, Florida, on April 30, 1982, to Cuban immigrants, she is professionally known as Jei and Jane Castro.

Early career 

Jane Castro first began performing in high school as a part of the school chorus and drama club. On her 15th birthday she released her first demo with two songs related to the celebrated Spanish tradition of Quinceañera or ‘Sweet Fifteen’. Following this Jei was featured in an article in The Miami Herald about local musical talent and was also interviewed by several other local magazines.

Coverage in these publications opened several opportunities for the performer. The National Foundation for the Advancement of the Arts (NFAA) invited her to participate in their Alumni Award, an annual national singing contest. The YoungArts programme was established in 1981 to encourage young talent. Castro also performed on MTV's Spring Break and American Idol 2003. Following this Jei was invited to appear at several other MTV venues.

As Castro's profile was growing she began to get more involved in the underground house music scene that was thriving in Miami. In clubs such as Space she met established music professionals like Edgar V., Oscar Gaetan of Murk Productions, Ralph Falcón, Charlie Solana and Sammy O. Jei began to develop her own style by performing in some of the leading clubs through Hot Jam Entertainment.

Recordings 

In May 2011 Jei recorded ‘Amame’, which was produced by Ralph Falcón on Nervous Records. According to the Miami New Times, Falcón and Oscar Gaetan “defined [the 90s] worldwide house sound” achieving seven consecutive number one singles on Billboard’sHot Dance Music/Club Play chart. It was released as a single for a year exclusively on vinyl to commemorate the 20-year anniversary of Murk Records and described as “homegrown Latin-flavored Miami house at its best”.

‘Amame’ has been remixed by numerous artists including Claude Monnet, Dyed Soundorom Downtown, Radio Slave, Noir and René Kristensen. It has also featured on numerous house and club albums and was used during the 2012 Miss World competition.

Jei released ‘Enlevez-Moi’ with DJ Christian Falero on Sydney Blu's label, Blu Music in 2011. A remix of ‘Enlevez-Moi’ by Paul Thomas was featured on Sirius Radio and the UK's BBC Radio 1 and subsequently featured by Sydney Blu on Nervous Records.

Jei released the solo single ‘Show Me The Money’ and produced by Giuseppe D. of Spy Music Group. The track was released on iTunes to coincide with her debut on U.S. reality TV show ‘Tough Love’. In 2013 the artist released the "Brave Myself" EP via O - Beat Entertainment.

Also in 2013,  Jei performed at the renowned International Dance Music Awards (IDMA) where ‘Amame’ (featuring Jei) was nominated in the category of Best House/Garage/Deep House Track.

In 2014, Jei has released her first album Entitled - JEI. Produced by Oba Frank Lords with Songs Written by: Michael M, Jei, and Oba Frank Lords.

In 2021 - Jei has released with Grammy Award Winner Tracy Young The Young Collective feat. Jei "Ochun"

Tough love 

Jei joined the cast of reality show, ‘Tough Love’ in the third season of the Vh-1 show. The series debuted to over 1 million viewers and is based on the concept of a dating ‘boot camp’ in which several women compete in dating challenges designed to makeover their love lives.

Speaking about the advice received on the programme, Castro said that every woman “should know to not move too fast. Be sure to slow down and relax. Let it happen and enjoy the moment. Don’t worry about, will he call me? Will he text me? You are ruining it for yourself.”

Her persona on the show was described as ‘Miss Bossy’. Responding in an interview with NBC Miami to criticism of her character on the show, Jei said: “When I read the blogs, even if they are mean, I love it. It makes the show even more entertaining. They can talk as much trash as they want because if someone is reading [the blogs] [and] hasn’t seen the show before, they might think, ‘Wow, I need to tune in.’”

DUI 

On August 4, 2010, Castro was arrested for Driving under the influence (DUI). The incident was subsequently broadcast on the second episode of Tough Love. She described the event as a landmark moment in her life: “...Seeing my mug shot was a bigger wake up call... I hope people learn from my experience.”

Gay Ally

Jei performed at Bear Nation Gay Pride 2012 at Chalk Miami Beach and is due to both perform at the 2013 Miami Gay Pride Parade, joining Michael M. on a float organised by Pepe Billete, a Miami New Times columnist and radio/TV personality.

In 2013 Jei was part of Orgullo Gay Pride which is a non - profit organization for the LGBT Hispanic/Latino Community that was taken part in Miami Beach, Fl. Jei will part of Orgullo Gay Pride in 2014.

In 2014 and 2015 Jei has been nominated for Favorite Singer/Band in the Pink Flamingo Awards held in Miami Beach, Fl.  honoring people, places and organizations that have demonstrated a level of excellence in the LGBT community throughout the year. Jei is also a member of Unity Coalition - The First & Only organization for the
So. Fla. Latino|Hispanic|LGBT Community (lesbian, gay, bisexual, transgender, questioning)- advancing Equality & Fairness since 2002.

In 2019 - Jei participated in the Pride Fort Lauderdale celebration with Emma Sis Designs and Shawn Palacious, a glamorous runway fashion show at the Hard Rock Event Center at the Seminole Hard Rock Hotel & Casino in Hollywood, Fla. 
The star-studded fashion show, was hosted by “RuPaul’s Drag Race” Season 4 All-Star Naomi Smalls, fashion guru Carson Kresley (“Queer Eye for the Straight Guy”) and featuring creative garments by talented “Project Runway” alumni designers, will that showcased male, female, transgender and drag models sashaying across the runway in avant garde outfits.

In 2020 - Jane Castro/JEI was nominated and won Best of Miami 2020 Artist/Musician for Southfloridagaynews.com website where the winners were chosen by the readers of Southfloridagaynews.com

Select discography

Albums
'"2014"'
"JEI" - O - Beat Entertainment

'"2013"'
"Brave Myself" - O - Beat Entertainment

Compilation albums 

Jei has been featured in the following compilation albums:

‘”2016”’
”Marcos Carnaval - Samba", Marcos Caranaval -  Touch Away feat. Jei (various artists) - Tommy Boy Records
‘”2014”’
”Oscar G - Beat Volume 2 ”, Oscar G. Feat. Jei - Can't Fuck With You (various artists) – Nervous Records 
‘”2013”’
”Greetings From Miami 2013 Sampler”, (various artists) – 4Tune Entertainment, 
”Deep Down & Defected Volume 2”, (various artists) – ITH
”Brave Myself”, (various artists) – 4 Tune Entertainment
”Defected Presents Noir in the House”, (various) – Defected
‘”2012”’
”Noir in the House Remix Sampler”, (various artists) – Defected
”Deep Down & Defected”, (various) – ITH
”Deep House – Ministry of Sound”, (various artists) – Ministry of Sound
”Defected Presents The Opening Party Ibiza 2012”, (various) – ITH
”Defected Accapellas Deluxe Volume 10”, (various artists) – Defected
”Defected Presents Beach Clubbing Ibiza”, (various artists) – ITH
”Defected Present House Masters”, DJ Chus (various artists) – ITH
”Bargrooves Deeper 2.0”, Bargrooves
”Amame (The Lost Dubs)” – Defected
”Most Rated 2012” (various) – ITH

Singles 

2022
The Young Collective feat. JEI "Feel It" - Ferosh Recordings Tracy Young

2021
The Young Collective feat. JEI "Ochun" - Ferosh Recordings Tracy Young
CAN2 Presents JEI "Detox Your Love" - CAN2 Music and Media

2020
Sara Simms feat. JEI - "Finally" - Sara Simms production 
Leyva feat. JEI - "Set Me Free" - Exit 32 Recordings

2018
JEI - "Your Woman" - Gonna Be Records
JEI - "Blue Skies" - Big Mouth Music

2016
Ralph Falcon Feat. JEI - "Be Together" - MURK Records

2015
JEI - "Stay Strong/Survive" - Gonna Be Records

2013
JEI *Brave Myself - O - Beat Entertainment
JEI "I'm Ready - O - Beat Entertainment

2012
Amame - Intruder feat. Jei - Defected/Nervous Records

‘”2011”’
”Enlevez-Moi” with DJ Christian Falero - Blu Music
”Show Me The Money” - Spy Music Group

References 

1982 births
Living people
Participants in American reality television series
American people of Cuban descent
21st-century American singers
21st-century American women singers